This is a list of notable people who attended, or taught at, the University of Wisconsin–Madison:

Notable alumni

Nobel laureates

 John Bardeen, B.S. 1928 and M.S. 1929, only two-time recipient of the Nobel Prize in Physics in 1956 and 1972
 Saul Bellow, recipient of the Nobel Prize for Literature in 1976
 Günter Blobel, Ph.D. 1967, recipient of the Nobel Prize in Physiology or Medicine in 1999
 Paul D. Boyer, M.S. 1941, Ph.D. 1943, recipient of the Nobel Prize in Chemistry in 1997
 William C. Campbell, M.S. 1953, Ph.D. 1957, recipient of the Nobel Prize in Physiology or Medicine in 2015
 Herbert Spencer Gasser, A.B. 1910, A.M. 1911, recipient of the Nobel Prize in Physiology or Medicine in 1944
 Alan G. MacDiarmid, M.S. 1952, Ph.D. 1953, recipient of the Nobel Prize in Chemistry in 2000
 Stanford Moore, Ph.D. 1938, recipient of the Nobel Prize in Chemistry in 1972
 Erwin Neher, M.S. 1967, recipient of the Nobel Prize in Physiology or Medicine in 1991
 Theodore Schultz, M.S. 1928, Ph.D. 1930, recipient of the Nobel Prize in Economics in 1979
 George Smith, postdoctoral fellow, recipient of the Nobel Prize in Chemistry in 2018
 Edward Lawrie Tatum, B.A. 1931, M.S. 1932, Ph.D. 1935, recipient of the Nobel Prize in Physiology or Medicine in 1958
 John H. Van Vleck, A.B. 1920, recipient of the Nobel Prize in Physics in 1977

Har Gobind Khorana, 1968 Nobel Prize in Physiology or Medicine, for describing the genetic code and how it operates in protein synthesis

Athletics

Academics

Arts and entertainment

 Virgil Abloh, fashion designer, artistic director of Louis Vuitton's men's wear collection
 Don Ameche, Academy Award-winning actor
 Joseph Anthony, playwright, actor, and director
 Iris Apfel, interior designer, and fashion icon.
 William Bast, screenwriter
 Adrian "Wildman" Cenni, professional driver and stuntman
 Gary Beecham, glass artist
 James Benning
 Andrew Bergman, film writer, director, and producer
 Rick Berman, television/movie producer
 Chester Biscardi, composer
 Keith D. Black, screenwriter
 Jerry Bock, composer
 Karen Borca, musician
 Kate Borcherding, artist
 Pat Brady, cartoonist, creator of Rose Is Rose
 Tamara Braun, actress
 Marshall Brickman, screenwriter
 Gary Hugh Brown, artist
 Oscar Brown, musician
 Johnny Burke, lyricist
 Macdonald Carey, actor
 Gina Cerminara, author
 Jeff Cesario, comedian and writer
 Ann Fox Chandonnet, poet
 Alison Chernick, filmmaker
 Dale Chihuly, glass artist
 Robert Clarke, actor
 Alf Clausen, film composer
 Hunter Cole, artist
 Carrie Coon, actress
 Joan Cusack, actress
 Rich Dahm, co-executive producer and head writer of The Colbert Report
 Richard Dauenhauer, poet
 Richard Davis, jazz-bassist, recording artist, professor/educator at University of Wisconsin-Madison
 André DeShields, Emmy Award-winning actor/singer/dancer/choreographer
 Chip Dunham, cartoonist
 Susan Dynner, film director, producer
 Lois Ehlert, illustrator, Caldecott Medal recipient
 Dean Elliott, film composer
 Joe Feddersen, artist
 David Fishelson, Broadway producer, playwright, filmmaker
 Honor Ford-Smith, actress
 Jason Gerhardt, actor
 Glenn Gissler, interior designer
 Jill Godmilow, filmmaker
 Roger Goeb, composer
 Bert I. Gordon, film director
 Stuart Gordon, stage and film director
 Evan Gruzis, painter
 MK Guth, artist
 Daron Hagen, composer, conductor, pianist
 Uta Hagen, actress, recipient of the National Medal of Arts
 Tom Hall, game designer
 Yung Gravy (Matthew Hauri), rapper
 Charlie Hill, television writer
 Anna Halprin, pioneer of postmodern dance
 Timothy Hasenstein, painter and sculptor
 Sorrel Hays, pianist
 Sam Herman, glass artist
 F. Scott Hess, painter and conceptual artist
 Lee Hoiby, composer
 Gwendolyn Holbrow, sculptor
 Anders Holm, actor, writer, producer for Workaholics
 Lawrence Holofcener, sculptor
 Adam Horowitz, television writer
 Jane Kaczmarek, actress
 Kelly Kahl, television executive
 Irene Kampen, author
 Ben Karlin, Emmy Award-winning television producer
 Catherine Ransom Karoly, flutist
 Carol Kolb, author, television writer
 Craig A. Kraft, sculptor
 Karl Kroeger, composer
 Myron W. Krueger, computer artist
 Kay Kurt, painter
 Rocco Landesman, producer
 Steven Levitan, television writer, director, and producer
 Marvin Lipofsky, glass artist
 Joseph Lulloff, musician
 C. Cameron Macauley, photographer
 Michael Mann, movie director/producer
 Fredric March, actor
 Steve Marmel, comedian, writer, Fairly Odd Parents
 Karen Thuesen Massaro, ceramicist
 Pat McCurdy, singer-songwriter
 John O. Merrill, architect
 Steve Miller, musician, Rock and Roll Hall of Fame inductee
 Kui Min
 Walter Mirisch, Academy Award-winning film producer
 Paul Monash, former screenwriter and producer
 Jemeel Moondoc, musician
 Agnes Moorehead, actress
 Errol Morris, Academy Award-winning director
 Kevin Murphy, writer, actor, and puppeteer for Mystery Science Theater 3000
 Michael Derrington Murphy, chemist and musician
 Zola Jesus, born Nika Roza Danilova, singer/songwriter

 Floyd Naramore, architect
 Bruce Nauman, glass artist
 Ken Navarro, jazz guitarist
 Jennifer Nehrbass, artist
 Aaron Ohlmann, editor, producer, and documentarian
 Tricia O'Kelley, actress
 Lance Olsen, writer and author
 Irna Phillips, actress; soap opera writer and script editor
 Meinhardt Raabe, Munchkin in the Wizard of Oz
 Nathan Rabin, film critic
 Som Ranchan, poet
 Rita Mae Reese, poet and publisher
 Rosetta Reitz, jazz historian
 Mary T. Reynolds, writer
 Mark Rosenberg, film producer
 Tom Rosenberg, Academy Award-winning film producer
 Brad Rowe, actor
 Gena Rowlands, actress
 Boz Scaggs (Wm. Royce Scaggs), musician
 Ira Schneider, video artist
 Jana Schneider, actress and journalist
 Jon Schueler, artist
 Michael Schultz, filmmaker and television director
 Delmore Schwartz, poet
 Seann William Scott, actor
 Barolong Seboni, poet
 Brittany Shane, singer and songwriter
 Tom Shannon
 Ben Sidran, jazz pianist
 Tormod Skagestad, director of Det Norske Teatret
 Joe Silver, Tony Award nominated actor of stage and screen
 Bently Spang, multidisciplinary artist
 Lev L. Spiro, television director
 Brian Stack, Emmy Award-winning writer and comic
 Josh Stamberg, actor
 Leon C. Standifer, horticulturist, novelist, and writer
 Robert Stone
 Herbert Stothart, film composer
 Richard Steven Street, photographer
 Sun Yu, film director
 David Susskind, producer of film and television
 John Szarkowski, curator and photographer
 Daniel J. Travanti, Emmy Award-winning actor
 Charlie Trotter, chef, PBS host
 Neal Ulevich, photographer
 James Valcq, composer
 Michael Velliquette, artist
 Butch Vig, musician, Garbage
 Eric Villency, interior designer
 William Walton, painter, government official
 Sylvia Solochek Walters, artist, printmaker and educator
 Marc Webb, film, television, and music video director
 Matt White, singer-songwriter
 Nancy Metz White, sculptor
 John Wilde, painter
 Allee Willis, songwriter
 Tom Wopat, actor/musician
 Frank Lloyd Wright (attended), architect
 Frank Wu, science-fiction artist
 Jorge Zamacona, television writer and producer
 Marilyn J Ziffrin, composer
 Glen Zipper, film producer
 Charlotte Zucker, actress
 David Zucker, movie director/producer
 Jerry Zucker, movie director/producer

Aviators and astronauts

 Laurel Clark, astronaut
 Roger G. DeKok, astronaut
 Fred E. Gutt, aviator
 Marcella Hayes, first African American woman pilot in the U.S. Armed Forces
 Walter Edwin Lees, aviator
 Charles Lindbergh, aviator (did not graduate)
 Nathan J. Lindsay, astronaut
 Jim Lovell, astronaut, Apollo 13 mission
 Robert Campbell Reeve, founder of Reeve Aleutian Airways
 Richard V. Rhode, aeronautical engineer, NACA and NASA; awarded Wright Brothers Medal in 1937
 Brewster Shaw, astronaut, former director, Space Shuttle Operations, NASA

Business

 Carol Bartz, former CEO of Yahoo!, former chairman of the board, president, and CEO of Autodesk, Inc.
 Randall Boe, general counsel for AOL
 Jerome Chazen, co-founder of Liz Claiborne
 Chow Chung-Kong, CEO of MTR Corporation
 M. J. Cleary, insurance executive
 Michael J. Critelli, executive chairman of Pitney Bowes
 William H. Davidson, former president of Harley-Davidson
 Willie G. Davidson, former vice president, Harley-Davidson
 Thomas J. Falk, CEO of Kimberly Clark
 Judith R. Faulkner, CEO and founder of Epic Systems
 Edgar Fiedler (1929–2003), economist
 Donald Goerke, Campbell Soup Company executive, inventor of SpaghettiOs
 William S. Harley, founder of Harley-Davidson
 Charles Walter Hart, founder of Hart-Parr Gasoline Engine Company, coined the word "tractor"
 Harvey V. Higley, president of Ansul
 Colin Huang, Founder, Chairman, and CEO of Pinduoduo
Lawrence R. Kaplan, president and CEO of SDVI
 David J. Lesar, chairman, president and CEO of Halliburton Energy Services
 Kevin Mather, baseball executive
 Larry McVoy, CEO, Bitmover
 John P. Morgridge, chairman of the board, former president and CEO of Cisco Systems, philanthropist
 William Beverly Murphy, former president and CEO, Campbell Soup Company
 Keith Nosbusch, CEO, Rockwell Automation
 Richard Notebaert, former chairman and CEO of Qwest, Tellabs and Ameritech
 Lee R. Raymond, former chairman and CEO, Exxon Mobil
 Philip D. Reed, former president of GE
 Stephen S. Roach, economist with Morgan Stanley
 John Rowe, CEO of Exelon
 Kenneth L. Schroeder, CEO, KLA-Tencor
 Deven Sharma, president of Standard and Poor's
 Jane Trahey, advertiser
 Reuben Trane, president of Trane
 Patrick Waddick, president and COO of Cirrus Aircraft Corporation
 Peter Booth Wiley, publisher
 Elmer Winter (1912–2009), founder of Manpower Inc.
 Lewis Wolff, real estate developer and owner of the Oakland Athletics and San Jose Earthquakes
 Zhu Yunlai, CEO of China International Capital Corp

Literature

 Nazik Al-Malaika, Iraqi poet
 Kevin J. Anderson, author
 Nuala Archer, poet
 Alice Elinor Bartlett, author
 Lynne Cheney, author, writer, and former Second Lady of the United States
 Donald Clarke, author on music
 Eleanor Clymer, children's author
 Betsy Colquitt, poet
 Jane Cooper, poet
 Richard Dauenhauer, poet
 August Derleth, writer, editor, anthologist of H. P. Lovecraft, and founder of Arkham House publishing
 Esther Forbes, author and Pulitzer Prize winner
 Genevieve Foster, author
 Zona Gale, author and playwright
 Robert Greene
 Sam Greenlee, author
 Horace Gregory, poet
 Frederick Gutheim, author
 Emily Hahn, author
 Lorraine Hansberry, author and playwright
 Eva Lund Haugen, author
 Michael Heiser, author and Biblical scholar
 David Henige, author
 Kevin Henkes, children's author
 Conrad Hilberry, poet
 Hjalmar Holand, author and historian
 bell hooks, author, writer, and activist
 Carolyn Hougan, writer
 Jim Hougan, writer
 Jens Joneleit, composer
 Lesley Kagen, author
 Jay Kennedy, editor-in-chief of King Features Syndicate
 Herbert Kubly, author and playwright
 Margery Latimer, author and writer
 Ann Lauterbach, poet
 Flora E. Lowry (1879–1933), anthologist
 Gordon MacQuarrie, author, writer, and outdoorsman
 Honoré Willsie Morrow, author, magazine editor
 Lotte Motz, scholar of German mythology
 Joyce Carol Oates, National Book Award-winning author and professor at Princeton University
 Ainehi Edoro, founder and editor of Brittle Paper
 Ed Ochester, poet
 Lance Olsen, author and writer
 Sigurd F. Olson, author and naturalist
 Alicia Ostriker, poet
 Kenneth Patchen, poet
 Gerald Peary, film critic
 Robert Peters, poet, playwright, critic, and professor
 Richard Quinney, author
 Som Ranchan, scholar and author
 Ellen Raskin, author
 Marjorie Kinnan Rawlings, Pulitzer Prize-winning author
 Ella Giles Ruddy (1851–1917), author, editor
 Sofia Samatar, professor, editor and writer
 Pamela Redmond Satran, entrepreneur and author
 Mark Schorer, writer, critic, and professor
 Delmore Schwartz, poet and writer
 Barolong Seboni, poet
 Clifford D. Simak, science fiction author
 Tormod Skagestad, poet
 Raymond J. Smith, literary critic
 John Snead, writer and role player
 Midori Snyder, writer and author
 David Stephenson, poet
 Peter Straub, author, recipient of the Bram Stoker Award, World Fantasy Award, and the International Horror Guild Award
 Mark Tatge, journalist
 Martha L. Poland Thurston, social leader, philanthropist, writer
 Steve Tittle, Canadian composer
 Danielle Trussoni, writer from La Crosse
 Francis Utley, folklorist and linguist
 James Valcq, composer and writer
 Stanley G. Weinbaum, science fiction author
 Jody Weiner, novelist, author, film producer
 Patricia Wells, author
 Eudora Welty, Pulitzer Prize-winning novelist
 Viola S. Wendt, poet
 E.J. Westlake, playwright
 Frank Wu, science fiction artist
 Mark Wunderlich, poet
 Marya Zaturenska, poet

News, journalism, and broadcasting

 Roy Adams, Canadian journalist
 Lynsey Addario, photojournalist
 Mary Agria, journalist/author
 Irene Osgood Andrews, former labor journalist
 Jim Armstrong, sports writer, The Denver Post
 Robert L. Bartley, former editor, Wall Street Journal
 Rod Beaton (1951–2011), sports journalist for USA Today
 Lowell Bergman, Pulitzer Prize-winning journalist
 Deborah Blum, Pulitzer Prize-winning journalist and author
 Walt Bogdanich, Pulitzer Prize-winning journalist and author
 Rita Braver, national reporter, CBS News
 William Broad, Pulitzer Prize-winning journalist and author
 Jane Brody, columnist, New York Times
 Peter Brunette, film critic (The Hollywood Reporter) and film historian
 Chris Bury, correspondent, Nightline
 Erik Bye, Norwegian journalist
 Tim Cahill, adventure travel writer, founding editor of Outside magazine
 Susan Carpenter, journalist and author
 Ethan Casey, journalist
 John Darnton, journalist
 Nancy Dickerson, journalist
 Doris Dungey, former blogger
 Andrew Feinberg, White House Correspondent for Breakfast Media
 Michael Feldman, host of Public Radio's Michael Feldman's Whad'Ya Know?
 Bob Franken, correspondent, CNN
 Elina Fuhrman, journalist
 Jeff Greenfield, senior political correspondent, CBS
 Ruth Gruber, author and journalist
 Usha Haley, business journalist
 Helen Holmes, journalist, historian, Women's Army Corps officer
 Paul Ingrassia, Pulitzer Prize-winning journalist
 Don L. Johnson, journalist and author
 Haynes Johnson, Pulitzer Prize-winning journalist
 Ben Karlin, creator and former executive producer, The Daily Show and The Colbert Report
 Andy Katz, college basketball writer, ESPN
 Jay Kennedy, journalist and writer
 Louis P. Lochner, journalist
 David Maraniss, Pulitzer Prize-winning journalist
 Patricia McConnell, co-host of Public Radio's Calling All Pets
 Robert D. McFadden, Pulitzer Prize-winning journalist
 Karl E. Meyer, journalist for The New York Times and editor of World Policy Journal
 Michael Meyer, journalist, travel writer
 Edwin Newman, former NBC news correspondent
 Arthur C. Nielsen Sr., founder of AC Nielsen (TV ratings and market research)
 Michele Norris, journalist at National Public Radio
 Miriam Ottenberg, Pulitzer Prize-winning journalist
 Danny Peary, film critic
 Gerald Peary, film critic
 Nathan Rabin, film critic
 Manu Raju, correspondent, CNN
 Gil Reavill, journalist and screenwriter
 Dan Ronan, former correspondent, CNN
 Chris Rose
 Phil Rosenthal, columnist, Chicago Tribune
 Susanne Rust, journalist
 Joe Schoenmann, journalist, author
 Joseph Sexton, journalist and reporter with the New York Times
 Anthony Shadid, Pulitzer Prize-winning journalist
 Algie Martin Simons, journalist
 Tom Skilling, chief meteorologist, WGN-TV
 William P. Steven, editor and newspaper executive, Tulsa Tribune, Minneapolis Tribune, Houston Chronicle
 James Suckling, wine and cigar critic
 Nilofar Suhrawardy, journalist
 Christopher Tennant, magazine editor
 Mildred Ladner Thompson, former journalist
 Stephen Thompson, NPR music journalist
 Dave Umhoefer, Pulitzer Prize-winning journalist
 David C. Unger, journalist, New York Times
 Greta Van Susteren, broadcaster and news analyst, Fox News Channel
 Tom Vanden Brook, journalist with USA Today
 Kenneth P. Vogel, journalist with Politico
 Mary Williams Walsh, journalist
 James Wieghart, journalist
 Conrad Worrill, broadcaster
 David Zurawik, author, journalist with The Baltimore Sun, assistant professor at Goucher College

Law and politics

A–G

 Charles L. Aarons, Milwaukee County Circuit Court judge
 Shirley Abrahamson, Chief Justice of the Wisconsin Supreme Court
 Henry Cullen Adams, U.S. Representative
 Iajuddin Ahmed, former President of Bangladesh
 Ronald E. Albers, California judge
 Anita Alpern, former IRS commissioner
 Arthur J. Altmeyer, former Commissioner of Social Security
 Thomas Ryum Amlie, U.S. Representative
 Rasmus B. Anderson, U.S. diplomat
 Wilson Ndolo Ayah, former foreign minister, Kenya
 William Bablitch, former justice, Wisconsin Supreme Court
 Sergio Balanzino, Italian diplomat
 Tammy Baldwin, U.S. Senator
 Hiram Barber, Jr., U.S. Representative from Illinois
 Peter W. Barca, U.S. Representative
 Charles V. Bardeen, former justice, Wisconsin Supreme Court
 Elmer E. Barlow, justice, Wisconsin Supreme Court
 Robert Barnett, attorney
 Tom Barrett, former U.S. Representative, mayor of Milwaukee, Wisconsin
 Charlene Barshefsky, former U.S. Trade Representative
 Robert McKee Bashford, former mayor of Madison, Wisconsin; former justice, Wisconsin Supreme Court
 Robert C. Bassett, U.S. presidential advisor
 Susan J. M. Bauman, former mayor of Madison, Wisconsin
 Joseph D. Beck, former United States Representative
 Bruce F. Beilfuss, former chief justice of Wisconsin
 Ernst Benda, Minister of the Interior of Germany and president the Federal Constitutional Court of Germany
 Helen Ginger Berrigan, federal judge
 Mario Ramón Beteta, former Secretary of Finance, Mexico
 Abdirahman Duale Beyle, Minister of Foreign Affairs and International Cooperation of Somalia
 George W. Blanchard, U.S. Representative
 George L. Blum, Eau Claire County Judge
 Nils Boe, 23rd Governor of South Dakota and judge for the United States Customs Court
 Randall Boe, attorney
 John W. Boehne, Jr., former U.S. Representative
 Alexander Campbell Botkin, Lieutenant Governor of Montana
 Ann Walsh Bradley, Justice, Wisconsin Supreme Court
 J. Quinn Brisben, Socialist Party USA candidate for President of the United States and Vice-President; civil rights activist; teacher
 Grover L. Broadfoot, Chief Justice of the Wisconsin Supreme Court
 Dave Bronson, Mayor of Anchorage, Alaska
 Angie Brooks, former president, United Nations General Assembly
 Timothy Brown, former chief justice of Wisconsin
 Webster E. Brown, U.S. Representative
 Edward E. Browne, U.S. Representative
 Andrew A. Bruce, former justice, North Dakota Supreme Court
 George Bunn, diplomat
 George Bunn, former justice, Minnesota Supreme Court
 John R. Burke, U.S. diplomat
 Michael E. Burke, U.S. Representative
 Elizabeth Burmaster, Superintendent of Public Instruction of Wisconsin
 Louis B. Butler, federal judicial nominee, former justice, Wisconsin Supreme Court
 Walter Halben Butler, former United States Representative
 John W. Byrnes, U.S. Representative
 William G. Callow, Wisconsin Supreme Court
 John Campbell
 Milton Robert Carr, U.S. Representative from Michigan
 Patrick G. Carrick, member of the Senior Executive Service
 Savion Castro, a member of the Board of Education in Madison, Wisconsin
 Sheri Polster Chappell, federal judge
 Dick Cheney, former vice president of the United States (attended UW as doctoral student; received M.A. degree but did not continue)
 Dave Cieslewicz, Mayor of Madison, Wisconsin
 Moses E. Clapp, U.S. Senator from Minnesota
 Kathryn F. Clarenbach, first chairperson of the National Organization for Women
 David G. Classon, U.S. Representative
 Wilbur J. Cohen, Secretary of Health, Education and Welfare in the Cabinet of President Lyndon B. Johnson and "Father of Medicare."
 William M. Conley, federal judge
 Daniel Cosío Villegas, president of the United Nations Economic and Social Council
 Barbara B. Crabb, former federal judge
 Lawrence William Cramer, former governor, United States Virgin Islands
 Jason Crow, U.S. Representative from Colorado
 Charles H. Crownhart, former justice, Wisconsin Supreme Court
 John Cudahy, U.S. diplomat
 Richard Dickson Cudahy, judge, U.S. Court of Appeals
 George R. Currie, former chief justice of the Wisconsin Supreme Court
 Herman Dahle, U.S. Representative
 George Jonathan Danforth, South Dakota State Senator
 Roland B. Day, former justice, Wisconsin Supreme Court
 John Paton Davies, Jr., U.S. diplomat
 Joseph E. Davies, U.S. diplomat
 Glenn Robert Davis, U.S. Representative
 Albert F. Dawson, former U.S. Representative
 Ada Deer, head of the U.S. Bureau of Indian Affairs
 Evo Anton DeConcini, former justice, Arizona Supreme Court
 Edward Dithmar, Lieutenant Governor of Wisconsin
 Christian Doerfler, former justice, Wisconsin Supreme Court
 Mark Doms, chief economist, Economics and Statistics Administration
 Brian Donnelly
 James Edward Doyle, former judge of the United States District Court for the Western District of Wisconsin
 James Edward "Jim" Doyle, 44th Governor of Wisconsin
 Lee S. Dreyfus, 40th Governor of Wisconsin
 Stan Dromisky, former Member of Parliament
 F. Ryan Duffy, former U.S. Senator and former judge of the U.S. Court of Appeals
 William S. Dwinnell, former Minnesota State Senator
 Lawrence Eagleburger, former U.S. Secretary of State
 Donald B. Easum, former U.S. diplomat
 Herman Ekern, Lieutenant Governor of Wisconsin
 Richard Elsner, lawyer, judge and Wisconsin state legislator
 Howard Engle (1919–2009), physician and lead plaintiff in a landmark lawsuit against the tobacco industry
 John J. Esch, U.S. Representative
 Evan Alfred Evans, former U.S. Appeals Court judge
 Tony Evers, Current Governor of Wisconsin and former Superintendent of Public Instruction of Wisconsin
 Thomas E. Fairchild, former U.S. Appeals Court judge
 Sergio Fajardo, former mayor of Medellín and former governor of Antioquia, Colombia
 Elizabeth P. Farrington, former U.S. Representative, Hawaii Territory
 Joseph Rider Farrington, former U.S. Representative, Hawaii Territory
 Russ Feingold, U.S. Senator
 Bill Foster, U.S. Representative from Illinois
 Alejandro Foxley, former foreign minister of Chile
 Chester A. Fowler, former justice, Wisconsin Supreme Court
 Oscar M. Fritz, former chief justice, Wisconsin Supreme Court
 Harold V. Froehlich, U.S. Representative
 G. Fred Galli, member of the Wisconsin State Assembly
 Kathryn Garcia (born 1970), Commissioner of the New York City Sanitation Department
 Anne Nicol Gaylor, political activist
 Edward J. Gehl, former justice, Wisconsin Supreme Court
 Bernard J. Gehrmann, U.S. Representative
 Hiram Gill, former mayor of Seattle, Washington
 J. Michael Gilmore, director of the Operational Test and Evaluation Directorate
 Myron L. Gordon, former federal judge
 Robert N. Gorman, former justice, Ohio Supreme Court
 Mark Green, U.S. diplomat
 Stephen S. Gregory, former president, American Bar Association
 Harry W. Griswold, U.S. Representative
 John A. Gronouski, United States Postmaster General
 Erica Groshen, commissioner, U.S. Bureau of Labor Statistics
 Herbert J. Grover, educator and legislator
 Kenneth Philip Grubb, former federal judge
 Philip Gunawardena, former Sri Lankan revolutionary, cabinet minister, Indian freedom fighter
 Gunnar Gundersen, member of the Parliament of Norway (2005–present)
 Henry Gunderson, Lieutenant Governor of Wisconsin
 Steve Gunderson, U.S. Representative

H–M

 Sami Haddad, Minister of Economy and Trade, Lebanon
 David Warner Hagen, former federal judge
 Oscar Hallam, justice of the Minnesota Supreme Court, Dean of the William Mitchell College of Law
 Sa'dun Hammadi, former prime minister of Iraq
 Don Hanaway, former Wisconsin Attorney General
 Connor Hansen, former justice, Wisconsin Supreme Court
 Doris Hanson, Wisconsin politician
 Spencer Haven, former attorney general of Wisconsin
 Charles Hawks, Jr., U.S. Representative
 S.I. Hayakawa, former U.S. Senator from California
 Everis A. Hayes, U.S. Representative from California
 James B. Hays, former chief justice, Idaho
 Donald Hayworth, former U.S. Representative
 Ned R. Healy, U.S. Representative from California
 Nathan Heffernan, former justice, Wisconsin Supreme Court
 Walter Heller, Economist end presidential advisor
 Robert Kirkland Henry, U.S. Representative
 Charles N. Herreid, Governor of South Dakota
 Emmett R. Hicks, former attorney general of Wisconsin
 Harvey V. Higley, former administrator of Veterans Affairs
 Knute Hill, former United States Representative from the State of Washington
 Geraldine Hines, Justice, Massachusetts Supreme Court
 Jeffry House, Canadian attorney
 Henry Huber, Lieutenant Governor of Wisconsin
 Benjamin N. Hulburd, Chief Justice of the Vermont Supreme Court
 Paul O. Husting, U.S. Senator
 Clifford Ireland, U.S. Representative from Illinois
 Andre Jacque, member of the Wisconsin State Assembly
 Edward H. Jenison, U.S. Representative from Illinois
 Byron L. Johnson, U.S. Representative from Colorado
 J. Leroy Johnson, former U.S. Representative
 Lester Johnson, U.S. Representative
 Sveinbjorn Johnson, former justice, North Dakota Supreme Court
 Burr W. Jones, U.S. Representative
 Howard Palfrey Jones, U.S. diplomat
 Richard Jones
 William Carey Jones, former U.S. Representative from State of Washington
 Jim Jordan, U.S. Representative, Ohio, two-time NCAA wrestling champion
 Pallo Jordan, former Minister of Arts and Culture, Republic of South Africa
 Charles A. Kading, U.S. Representative
 Steve Kagen, U.S. Representative
 Philip Mayer Kaiser, U.S. diplomat
 Henry Kajura, Deputy Prime Minister of Uganda
 Marcy Kaptur, U.S. Representative, Ohio
 Robert Kastenmeier, U.S. Representative
 David Keene, activist and chairman of the American Conservative Union
 Oscar Keller, U.S. Representative from Minnesota
 James C. Kerwin, former justice, Wisconsin Supreme Court
 Shishir Khanal, Nepali Minister of Education, Science and Technology
 John C. Kleczka, U.S. Representative
 Frank Le Blond Kloeb, U.S. Representative from Ohio
 Warren P. Knowles, 37th Governor of Wisconsin
 Herb Kohl, U.S. Senator
 Scott L. Klug, U.S. Representative
 Arthur W. Kopp, U.S. Representative
 Carolyn H. Krause, member of the Illinois House of Representatives
 Julius Albert Krug, U.S. Secretary of the Interior
 Akihiko Kumashiro, member of the House of Representatives of Japan
 John La Fave, Wisconsin politician
 Belle Case La Follette, women's suffragist and wife of Robert M. La Follette, Sr.
 Bronson La Follette, former attorney general of Wisconsin
 Philip La Follette, 27th Governor of Wisconsin
 Robert M. La Follette, Jr., U.S. Senator
 Robert M. La Follette, Sr., 20th Governor of Wisconsin, U.S. Representative and U.S. Senator
 Jeffrey M. Lacker, president, Federal Reserve Bank of Richmond
 Richard Lamm, Governor of Colorado
 John E. Lange, former U.S. Ambassador for Health and Pandemics
 Peg Lautenschlager, former attorney general of Wisconsin
 Charles Lavine, New York assemblyman
 Barbara Lawton, Lieutenant Governor of Wisconsin
 Frank Le Blond Kloeb, former U.S. Representative
 Elmer O. Leatherwood, former U.S. Representative
 Jon Leibowitz, chairman of the Federal Trade Commission
 Nick Leluk, former Member of Parliament
 Olin B. Lewis, former Minnesota politician
 Theodore G. Lewis, former justice, Wisconsin Supreme Court
 James C. Liao, president of Academia Sinica, Taiwan Academia Sinica.
 Thomas A. Loftus, U.S. diplomat
 James B. Loken, judge of the U.S. Court of Appeals
 William Lorge, Wisconsin politician
 Alan David Lourie, judge, U.S. Appeals Court
 Claude Zeth Luse, former federal judge
 Richard Barrett Lowe, Governor of American Samoa and Guam
 Patrick Joseph Lucey, U.S. diplomat and Governor of Wisconsin
 Henry Maier, former mayor of Milwaukee, Wisconsin
 James Manahan, former U.S. Representative
 John T. Manske, Wisconsin State Assemblyman
 David W. Márquez, former attorney general of Alaska
 John E. Martin, former chief justice, Wisconsin Supreme Court
 Henry F. Mason, former justice, Kansas Supreme Court
 Alyssa Mastromonaco, presidential aide
 Charles McCarthy, author of The Wisconsin Idea
 Francis E. McGovern, 22nd Governor of Wisconsin
 Howard J. McMurray, U.S. Representative
 Alexander J. Menza, former New Jersey legislator and judge
 Balthasar H. Meyer, member of the Interstate Commerce Commission
 Abner Mikva, former judge, U.S. Appeals Court
 Laura Miller, former mayor of Dallas, Texas
 Bob Mionske, attorney and former Olympic and professional bicycle racer
 William J. Morgan, former attorney general of Wisconsin
 Kamel Morjane, Foreign Minister of Tunisia
 Elmer A. Morse, U.S. Representative
 Wayne L. Morse, U.S. Senator from Oregon
 Edmund C. Moy, 38th director of the U.S. mint
 Dan Mozena, U.S. Ambassador to Angola
 Reid F. Murray, U.S. Representative
 Louis Westcott Myers, Chief Justice of the California Supreme Court

N–S

 Jayaprakash Narayan, Indian freedom fighter and political leader; awarded the Bharat Ratna in 1998
 Philleo Nash, government official, college professor
 Jennifer E. Nashold, Judge, Wisconsin Court of Appeals
 Akmal Nasir, Malaysian politician and current Member Of Parliament for Johor Bahru
 David D. Nelson, U.S. Ambassador to Uruguay
 Gaylord Nelson, former U.S. Senator, 35th Governor of Wisconsin and founder of Earth Day
 George B. Nelson, former justice, Wisconsin Supreme Court
 John M. Nelson, U.S. Representative
 Ivan A. Nestingen, former mayor of Madison, Wisconsin
 Mark Neumann, U.S. Representative
 John Norquist, former mayor of Milwaukee, Wisconsin
 David Obey, U.S. Representative
 Kenneth J. O'Connell, Chief Justice of the Oregon Supreme Court
 James L. O'Connor, former Wisconsin Attorney General
 Alvin O'Konski, U.S. Representative
 Tawiah Modibo Ocran, Supreme Court judge in Ghana
 Eric Oemig, Washington (state) legislator
 Conrad P. Olson, former justice, Oregon Supreme Court
 Walter C. Owen, former justice, Wisconsin Supreme Court
 Carolyn R. Payton, former director, Peace Corps
 Russell W. Peterson, Governor of Delaware
 Richard F. Pettigrew, former United States Senator
 Joy Picus, Los Angeles, California, city council member, 1977–91; Ms. magazine "Woman of the Year"
 Huang Pi-Twan, Minister for Culture, Taiwan
 Roger Pillath, retired NFL player, Los Angeles Rams and Pittsburgh Steelers
 Mark Pocan, U.S. Representative
 Jeanne Poppe, Minnesota legislator, member of the Minnesota House of Representatives
 Hugh H. Price, U.S. Representative
 David Prosser, Jr., Justice, Wisconsin Supreme Court
 John Abner Race, U.S. Representative
 David Rabinovitz, former federal judge
 Rudolph T. Randa, federal judge
 Clifford E. Randall, U.S. Representative
 Henry Riggs Rathbone, former U.S. Representative
 James Ward Rector, former Wisconsin Supreme Court justice
 Lowell A. Reed, federal judge
 Michael K. Reilly, U.S. Representative
 Paul Samuel Reinsch, appointed minister to China in 1913
 Oscar Rennebohm, former governor of Wisconsin
 John W. Reynolds, Sr., Attorney General of Wisconsin, 1927–1933
 John W. Reynolds, Jr., 36th Governor of Wisconsin
 Daniel Riemer, legislator
 Fred Risser, Wisconsin state senator and assemblyman
 Fred Risser (Progressive), Wisconsin assemblyman
 Charles Robb, former U.S. Senator and former governor of Virginia
 Julius Edward Roehr, member of the Wisconsin State Senate, 1897-1908
 Patience Roggensack, Justice, Wisconsin Supreme Court
 Hannah Rosenthal, executive director of the Office to Monitor and Combat Anti-Semitism
 Horace Rublee, former U.S. Ambassador to Switzerland
 David Sturtevant Ruder, chairman of the U.S. Securities and Exchange Commission
 Wiley Rutledge, Justice of the U.S. Supreme Court
 Albert Morris Sames, former federal judge
 Arthur Loomis Sanborn, former federal judge
 David J. Saposs, former chief economist for the National Labor Relations Board
 Harry Sauthoff, U.S. Representative
 Jim Sensenbrenner, U.S. Representative
 Whitney North Seymour, former president, American Bar Association
 John C. Shabaz, former federal judge
 David I. Shapiro, attorney and activist
 Helen Shiller, Chicago Alderman
 Robert G. Siebecker, former chief justice of Wisconsin
 J. Minos Simon, attorney, legal author in Lafayette, Louisiana
 Stewart Simonson, Assistant Secretary of Public Health Emergency Preparedness
 Slawomir Skrzypek, former president, National Bank of Poland
 Chad "Corntassel" Smith, principal chief of the Cherokee Nation
 Daniel V. Speckhard, U.S. ambassador and diplomat
 Paul Soglin, Mayor of Madison, Wisconsin
 Joan E. Spero, former ambassador to the United Nations Economic and Social Council
 John Coit Spooner, U.S. Senator
 William Spriggs, assistant secretary, United States Department of Labor
 Janet Dempsey Steiger, chairperson of the Postal Rate Commission and Federal Trade Commission
 William A. Steiger, Congress
 Donald Steinmetz, former justice, Wisconsin Supreme Court
 E. Ray Stevens, former justice, Wisconsin Supreme Court
 William H. Stevenson, former U.S. Representative
 Anne K. Strasdauskas, Sheriff of Baltimore County, Maryland
 Robert C. Strong, U.S. diplomat
 Suchatvee Suwansawat, Thai Politicians, former President of King Mongkut's Institute of Technology Ladkrabang (KMITL) 
 Jessie Sumner, former U.S. Representative
 Lori Swanson, Attorney General of Minnesota
 Aleksander Szczyglo, Minister of Defense of Poland
 Elaine Szymoniak, former Iowa State Senator

T–Z

 James Albertus Tawney, former U.S. Representative
 Amando Tetangco Jr., former Governor, Bangko Sentral ng Pilipinas
 Donald Edgar Tewes, U.S. Representative
 Nahathai Thewphaingarm, former Thai Minister of Education and spokesperson of Thai Rak Thai Party
 Lewis D. Thill, U.S. Representative
 George Thompson, Attorney General of Wisconsin
 Tommy Thompson, former U.S. Secretary of Health and Human Services; former governor of Wisconsin (1986–2001)
 Vernon W. Thomson, U.S. Representative and Governor of Wisconsin
 Fran Ulmer, Lieutenant Governor of Alaska
 J.B. Van Hollen, Attorney General of Wisconsin
 William Freeman Vilas, U.S. Secretary of the Interior and U.S. Postmaster General
 Aad J. Vinje, former justice, Wisconsin Supreme Court
 Edward Voigt, U.S. Representative
 Thomas J. Walsh, U.S. Senator from Montana
 Clement Warner, Civil war colonel and Wisconsin state legislator
 Ernest Warner, Wisconsin assemblyman
 Robert W. Warren, former federal judge
 D. Russell Wartinbee, legislator and educator
 Alexander Watson, former U.S. diplomat
 Edward Weidenfeld, attorney
 Paul Weyrich, conservative activist and former president of the Free Congress Foundation
 John D. Wickhem, former justice, Wisconsin Supreme Court
 Peter D. Wigginton, former U.S. Representative
 Jon P. Wilcox, Justice, Wisconsin Supreme Court
 Alexander Wiley, U.S. Senator
 Horace W. Wilkie, former chief justice, Wisconsin Supreme Court
 Aaron S. Williams, director, Peace Corps
 Michael D. Wilson, associate justice, Hawaii Supreme Court
 John B. Winslow, former chief justice, Wisconsin Supreme Court
 Edwin E. Witte, Social Security advisor to President Franklin Delano Roosevelt
 Leonard G. Wolf, former U.S. Representative
 Lawrence Wong, Singaporean politician and cabinet minister; current Minister for Education and Second Minister for Finance
 Ann Wynia, Minnesota State Representative
 Clayton K. Yeutter, U.S. Secretary of Agriculture
 Rebecca Young, Wisconsin politician
 Hilbert Philip Zarky, attorney
 Norma Zarky, attorney
 Maung Zarni, Burmese educator, academic, and human rights activist noted for his opposition to the violence in Rakhine State and Rohingya genocide
 Yeshey Zimba, former prime minister of Bhutan
 Roger H. Zion, former U.S. Representative

Military

 Frank L. Anders, Medal of Honor recipient
 Thomas A. Benes, U.S. Marine Corps major general
 Robyn J. Blader, U.S. National Guard brigadier general
 Charles Ruggles Boardman, U.S. National Guard brigadier general
 Joseph J. Brandemuehl, U.S. Air National Guard brigadier general
 Clarence John Brown, U.S. Navy vice admiral
 Howard G. Bunker, U.S. Air Force major general
 Robert Whitney Burns, U.S. Air Force lieutenant general
 Chester Victor Clifton, Jr., U.S. Army major general
 James B. Currie, U.S. Air Force major general
 Clinton W. Davies, U.S. Air Force brigadier general
 Gary L. Ebben, U.S. Air Force brigadier general
 Samuel Fallows, Union Army brigadier general
 Gregory A. Feest, U.S. Air Force major general
 Richard W. Fellows, U.S. Air Force brigadier general
 Irving Fish, U.S. Army major general
 James F. Flock, U.S. Marine Corps major general
 William Frederick Hase, U.S. Army major general
 J. Michael Hayes, U.S. Marine Corps brigadier general
 Richard W. Hunt, U.S. Navy vice admiral
 Harry W. Jenkins, U.S. Marine Corps major general
 Stephen E. Johnson, U.S. Navy rear admiral
 Donald S. Jones, U.S. Navy vice admiral
 Timothy M. Kennedy, U.S. National Guard brigadier general
 Richard A. Knobloch, U.S. Air Force brigadier general
 Oscar Hugh La Grange, Union Army brigadier general
 John David Larson, U.S. National Guard brigadier general
 Daniel P. Leaf, U.S. Air Force lieutenant general; former commander of United States Pacific Command
 Otto Lessing, U.S. Marine Corps major general
 John D. Logeman, U.S. Air Force major general
 Michael J. McCarthy, U.S. Air Force major general
 John E. McCoy, U.S. Air National Guard brigadier general
 Robert Bruce McCoy, U.S. National Guard major general
 Todd J. McCubbin, U.S. Air Force brigadier general
 Charles C. McDonald, U.S. Air Force general
 Montgomery Meigs, U.S. Army general
 David V. Miller, U.S. Air Force major general
 Peter George Olenchuk, U.S. Army major general
 Jeffrey W. Oster, U.S. Marine Corps lieutenant general
 John P. Otjen, U.S. Army lieutenant general
 Walter P. Paluch, Jr., U.S. Air Force brigadier general
 J. Gregory Pavlovich, U.S. Air Force brigadier general
 Francis E. Quinlan, U.S. Marine Corps brigadier general
 Russell Burton Reynolds, U.S. Army major general
 Robley S. Rigdon, U.S. Army National Guard brigadier general
 Carson Abel Roberts, U.S. Marine Corps lieutenant general
 Walter Schindler, U.S. Navy vice admiral
 Robert O. Seifert, U.S. National Guard brigadier general
 Winant Sidle, U.S. Army major general
 Fred R. Sloan, U.S. Air National Guard major general
 Phillips Waller Smith, U.S. Air Force major general
 Henry J. Stehling, U.S. Air Force brigadier general
 Woodrow Swancutt, U.S. Air Force major general
 Scott L. Thoele, U.S. Army National Guard brigadier general
 Tracy A. Thompson, U.S. Army major general
 Holger Toftoy, U.S. Army major general
 Richard Tubb, U.S. Air Force brigadier general; physician to the president
 George V. Underwood, Jr., U.S. Army general; former commander of Fort Bliss and commander-in-chief of United States Southern Command
 William J. Van Ryzin, U.S. Marine Corps lieutenant general
 James M. Vande Hey, U.S. Air Force brigadier general
 Fred W. Vetter, Jr., U.S. Air Force brigadier general
 Don S. Wenger, U.S. Air Force major general
 Robert E. Wheeler, U.S. Air Force brigadier general
 Ralph Wise Zwicker, U.S. Army major general

Religion

 Frank Joseph Dewane, Bishop of the Roman Catholic Diocese of Venice in Florida
 W. Patrick Donlin, Supreme Advocate of the Knights of Columbus
 Michael S. Heiser, Christian author
 Florence E. Kollock (1848-1925), Universalist minister and lecturer
 Marion Murdoch, Christian minister
 Ronald Myers, Baptist minister
 Paul J. Swain, Bishop of the Roman Catholic Diocese of Sioux Falls

Science, technology, and engineering

A–M

 Amy Aiken, winemaker
 Howard Aiken, computer science pioneer and recipient Edison Medal
 Loyal Blaine Aldrich, astronomer
 Ruth F. Allen, plant pathologist
 Gene Amdahl, computer scientist, Amdahl's law
 Elda Emma Anderson, physicist
 John Atanasoff, inventor of the electronic digital computer
 Chris Bangle, automobile designer, former Chief of Design for the BMW Group
 Florence Bascom (1862–1945), geologist
 Ekkehard Bautz (born 1933), molecular biologist
 Calvin Beale, demographer
 Gwen Bell, former president of The Computer Museum, Boston
 Willard Harrison Bennett, inventor and scientist
 Paul Alfred Biefeld, electrical engineer, astronomer and teacher
 Robert Byron Bird, chemical engineer, recipient of the National Medal of Science
 William Bleckwenn, neurologist and psychiatrist, instrumental in the development of the truth serum
 Joseph Colt Bloodgood, physician
 Larry Curtiss, chemist
 Gerard C. Bond, geologist
 Paul Brehm, neurobiologist
 Ernest J. Briskey, scientist, founder of the American Meat Science Association
 George H. Brown, inventor, television pioneer, and Edison Medal recipient
 William Bunge, geographer
 Gail Carpenter, neuroscientist and mathematician
 Olivia Castellini, physicist
 K. K. Chen, researcher, Eli Lilly and Company
 John Drury Clark, rocket engineer
 Emily CoBabe-Ammann, planetary scientist
 Douglas L. Coleman, biochemist
 John Thomas Curtis, botanist and ecologist; the Bray Curtis dissimilarity is partially named for him
 Donald Dafoe, surgeon
 Charles A. Doswell III, meteorologist
 Michael Dhuey, electrical and computer engineer, co-inventor of the Macintosh II and the iPod
 L. K. Doraiswamy, chemical engineer, proponent of organic synthesis engineering and Padma Bhushan award winner
 Olin J. Eggen, astronomer
 Bruce Elmegreen, astronomer
 Howard Engle, physician
 Milton H. Erickson, psychiatrist, founder of the American Society of Clinical Hypnosis
 Alice Catherine Evans, microbiologist
 Frederick C. Finkle, geologist
 Michael J. Franklin, computer scientist
 Louis Friedman, engineer
 Michael Garey, computer scientist
 Sol Garfunkel, mathematician
 Harold Garner, biophysicist
 Meredith Gardner, linguist and codebreaker
 David H. Geiger, engineer and designer of domed stadiums
 Alwyn Howard Gentry, botanist
 Eloise Gerry, scientist with United States Forest Service
 Gerson Goldhaber, discoverer of the charmed meson, and dark energy
 Sulamith Goldhaber, physicist and spectroscopist
 Danny Goodman, computer scientist and programmer
 Morris Goodman, scientist
 Eric D. Green, director of the National Human Genome Research Institute
 Hary Gunarto, computer engineer
 Paul Haeberli, computer programmer
 Tom Hall, game designer, co-founder of id Software
 Pat Hanrahan, computer scientist specializing in graphics, Turing Award laureate
 Henry Paul Hansen, palynologist
 Bruce William Hapke, planetary scientist
 Walter Henry Hartung, pharmaceutical chemist
 Leland John Haworth, physicist and director of the National Science Foundation
 Susan Lynn Hefle, food allergen scientist
 Ralph F. Hirschmann (1922–2009), biochemist who led synthesis of the first enzyme
 Vasant Honavar, computer scientist, computational biologist, cognitive scientist, artificial intelligence, machine learning researcher, former program director, National Science Foundation
 Earnest Hooton, physical anthropologist
 Charles Morse Huffer, astronomer
 Karl Jansky, physicist and radio engineer, founder of radio astronomy
 Larry R. Johnson, president of the National Weather Association
 Richard A. Jorgensen, molecular geneticist
 Willi Kalender, inventor of spiral scan computed tomography and professor at the University of Erlangen-Nuremberg
 Dennis Keeney, soil scientist, first director of the Leopold Institute
 Motoo Kimura, mathematician
 Clyde Kluckhohn, anthropologist
 Elmer Kraemer, chemist
 Ben Lawton, physician
 Esther Lederberg, microbiologist and immunologist, pioneer of bacterial genetics
 Albert Lehninger, biochemist, pioneer of bioenergetics, and professor at Johns Hopkins University
 Estella B. Leopold, botanist and daughter of Aldo Leopold
 Harriet Lerner, psychologist
 Karl Paul Link, biochemist, discoverer of anticoagulant warfarin
 Walter K. Link, geologist
 Bradley C. Livezey, ornithologist
 Guy Sumner Lowman, Jr., linguist
 Daryl B. Lund, food scientist and engineer, editor-chief-of Journal of Food Science
 Ken Lunde, information processor
 Nancy Oestreich Lurie, anthropologist
 Jay Lush, geneticist
 John F. MacGregor, statistician
 Seth Marder, chemist
 Lynn Margulis, author of the serial endosymbiotic theory of cell development, advocate of the Gaia hypothesis; former professor at University of Massachusetts Amherst
 William Marr, engineer and poet
 Max Mason, mathematician
 Karl Menninger, psychiatrist
 Patrick Michaels, climatologist
 Parry Moon, electrical engineer, author
 M. Laurance Morse, microbiologist and immunologist
 Newton Ennis Morton, founder of field of genetic epidemiology
 Mark Myers, geologist and former USGS director

N–Z

 Walter Nance, geneticist
 Homer E. Newell, Jr., mathematician
 Paula M. Niedenthal, psychologist
 Arthur Nielsen, market analyst
 Gerald North, atmospheric scientist, author of The North Report
 Larry E. Overman, chemist
 Zorba Paster, physician
 Brian Paul, computer programmer of the Mesa 3D open source graphics library
 Emanuel R. Piore, former director of research, IBM
 Lynn Ponton, psychiatrist
 Vaidyeswaran Rajaraman, computer science pioneer and Padma Bhushan awardee
 Richard V. Rhode, aeronautical engineer
 Sylvia Rimm, psychology
 JoAnne Robbins, creator of dysphagia medical device
 Anita Roberts, molecular biologist
 Havidan Rodriguez, award-winning sociologist, author
 Carl Rogers, psychologist, co-founder humanistic psychology
 Leon E. Rosenberg, physician-scientist, geneticist, and educator
 Marshall Rosenberg, psychologist
 Harry Luman Russell, bacteriologist
 Joseph F. Rychlak, psychologist
 Joseph F. Sackett, clinical radiologist and professor of neuroradiology
 David Salo, linguist and translator
 John C. Sanford, plant geneticist
 William Bowen Sarles, microbiologist
 John L. Savage, chief engineer of Hoover Dam
 William Schaus, entomologist
 Edward Schildhauer, a chief engineer on the Panama Canal project
 Robert Serber, physicist, participated in the Manhattan Project
 Digvijai Singh, chemical engineer, Shanti Swarup Bhatnagar laureate
 Ashley Shade Director of Research at the Institute of Ecology and the Environment within Le Centre National de la Recherche Scientifique
 Dick Smith, software engineer and computer consultant
 James E. Smith, computer engineer
 Willem P.C. Stemmer, engineer
 Calvin L. Stevens, chemist
 Chauncey Guy Suits, former research director for GE
 M.S. Swaminathan, "father of the Green Revolution in India"
 Leslie Denis Swindale, soil scientist
 Helmer Swenholt, commanding officer of the 332nd Engineer General Service Regiment
 Katia Sycara, roboticist
 Stephen Taber III, apiologist
 Auguste Taton, botanist
 Earle M. Terry, formed WHA (AM), the first radio station to clearly transmit human speech, with Edward Bennett
 Victor A. Tiedjens, scientist
 James Tour, synthetic organic chemist
 Tso Wung-Wai, professor at the Chinese University of Hong Kong, political activist
 Marilyn Tremaine, computer scientist
 Glenn Thomas Trewartha, geographer
 Mary Tsingou, numerical analyst
 Billie Lee Turner II, geographer
 Kameshwar C. Wali, research physicist and science writer
 John Watrous, quantum theorist of computing
 Warren Weaver, pioneer of machine translation
 I. Bernard Weinstein, physician
 Louis Jolyon West, psychiatrist
 Albert Whitford, astronomer
 Dave Winer, software designer
 Samuel D. Wonders, engineer, president of Carter's Ink Company
 Gordon Woods, veterinary scientist
 Charles E. Woodworth, entomologist
 A. Wayne Wymore, systems engineer and mathematician
 Ned Xoubi, nuclear engineer
 Joy Zedler, ecologist and botanist
 Ying E. Zhang, biochemist and senior investigator at the National Cancer Institute
 John Zillman, meteorologist
 Otto Julius Zobel, inventor of the m-derived filter and the Zobel network

Other notable alumni

 Milo Aukerman, biochemist, front man of the Descendents
 Mary Brunner, former Manson Family member and ex-girlfriend of cult leader Charles Manson
 Clarence Chamberlin, aviation pioneer
 Frank J. Christensen, labor leader
 Kathryn F. Clarenbach, first chairwoman of the National Organization for Women
 Tim Cordes, blind physician
 Laurie Dann, mass shooter who attacked elementary school children in Winnetka, Illinois
 Anna Essinger (1879–1960), educator who aided hundreds of European children before, during and after the Holocaust
 Robert Fassnacht, graduate student, killed in the Sterling Hall bombing
 Ada Fisher, physician
 Phil Galfond, 3-time WSOP bracelet-winning champion
 Frederick Gutheim, urban planner
 Eva Lund Haugen, author and editor
 Jerome Heckenkamp, computer hacker
 Phil Hellmuth, 14-time WSOP bracelet-winning champion
 Prynce Hopkins, activist and psychologist
 Robert Kotler, physician
 Drew Binsky, Traveller and youtuber, has visited over 170 countries
 Mary Lasker, health activist, recipient of the Presidential Medal of Freedom and Congressional Gold Medal
 James T. Minor, academic administrator and sociologist.
 John Muir (1838–1914), naturalist, founder of the Sierra Club, instrumental in preserving Yosemite National Park
 Carol Myers-Scotton, linguist
 Sigurd F. Olson, conservationist
 Pauline Park, transgender activist
 Janet Meakin Poor, landscape designer
 Lori Ringhand, judicial analyst
 Carl Schramm, president, Ewing Marion Kauffman Foundation
 Bud Selig, Commissioner of Major League Baseball
 Rafael Rangel Sostmann, rector of Monterrey Institute of Technology and Higher Education and member of the World Bank
 Bill Stumpf, furniture designer
 Charlie Trotter, chef
 Althea Warren, president of the American Library Association, 1943–44

Fictional alumni and faculty 

 Lowell Bergman (Al Pacino) in the 1999 movie The Insider (film)
 Chris (Will Arnett), MRI tech on TV series Parks and Recreation, says he went to UW for both his undergrad and graduate work.
 Harold "Harry" Crane, head of Sterling Cooper Draper Pryce's television department in Mad Men
 Jack and Maddie Fenton, scientist parents of Danny Phantom
 Laurie Forman, character on the situation comedy That '70s Show (did not graduate)
 Will Hayes (Ryan Reynolds) in the 2008 movie Definitely, Maybe
 Vladimir "Vlad" Masters, a/k/a Vlad Plasmius, supervillain and foe of Danny Phantom
 Donna Moss, White House staffer in the television series The West Wing (dropped out halfway through to support her boyfriend as he went through medical school)
 Alison Parker (Melrose Place) (Courtney Thorne-Smith) on Melrose Place, the TV series which ran from 1992 to 1999.
 President Andrew Shepherd (Michael Douglas) taught at the University of Wisconsin in the 1995 movie The American President
 A. Clarence "Silverlock" Shandon, titular character of the fantasy novel Silverlock, has a business administration degree from U.W. and was bow on the crew team for three years
 James Walker (Michael Vartan) from Big Shots (TV series), an 11-episode TV series.
 Many, perhaps most, of the characters in the 2006 film The Last Kiss, set in Madison and in part on the UW campus, are connected to the university: Kim is a student, Professor Bowler is on the faculty, and several other characters are apparently alumni.

Chancellors and presidents

Notable faculty and staff 

A–G

 Martha W. Alibali, psychologist
 Timothy F. H. Allen, botanist
 Stub Allison, head coach of the Washington Huskies, South Dakota Coyotes, and California Golden Bears football teams, Washington Huskies men's basketball team, and Washington Huskies baseball team
 Ann Althouse, professor of law and well-known blogger
 Rasmus B. Anderson, professor, author, diplomat
 Rozalyn Anderson, assistant professor, scientist
 Fred J. Ansfield, physician, chemotherapy pioneer, co-Founder of American Society of Clinical Oncology, Emeritus Professor of Human Oncology
 Michael Apple, leading educational theorist
 Richard Askey, mathematician, the Askey–Wilson polynomials and Askey–Gasper inequality are partially named for him
 Sanjay Asthana, Alzheimer's disease researcher
 Louis Winslow Austin, physicist, recipient of the IEEE Medal of Honor
 Stephen Babcock, inventor of the Babcock test for measuring the butterfat content of milk
 Bob Babich, NFL assistant coach
 Eric Bach, computer scientist
 Ira Baldwin, bacteriologist
 Charles Russell Bardeen, first dean of the University of Wisconsin Medical School
 Amy Barger, astronomer
 Michael Barnett, scholar of international relations
 Quan Barry, poet
 Helmut Beinert, professor of biochemistry
 Edward Bennett, professor of electrical engineering, formed WHA (AM), the first radio station to clearly transmit human speech, with Earle M. Terry
 Tony Bennett, NBA player and head coach of the Virginia Cavaliers men's basketball team
 Leonard Berkowitz, psychologist
 Robert Byron Bird, chemical engineer, recipient of the National Medal of Science
 George David Birkhoff, mathematician, discoverer of the ergodic theorem
 Raymond Ward Bissell, art historian
 Lisle Blackbourn, NFL head coach
 Gary Blackney, head coach of the Bowling Green Falcons football team
 Earl Blaik, head coach of the Dartmouth Big Green and Army Black Knights football teams, member of the College Football Hall of Fame
 William Bleckwenn, neurologist and psychiatrist, instrumental in the development of the truth drug
 Craig Bohl, head coach of the North Dakota State Bison football team
 David Bordwell, prominent neoformalist film theorist and author
 Laird Boswell, professor of History
 George E. P. Box, statistician
 Paul S. Boyer, historian of American thought and culture
 Léon Brillouin, physicist
 Royal Alexander Brink, plant geneticist
 Thomas D. Brock, microbiologist
 Martin Bronfenbrenner, economist
 Aaron Brower, professor of social work and Vice-Provost for Teaching & Learning
 Richard A. Brualdi, professor of combinatorial mathematics
 Robert V. Bruce, winner of the 1988 Pulitzer Prize for History
 Edgar Buckingham, physicist
 Tim Buckley, head coach of the Ball State Cardinals men's basketball team
 Jacob Burney, NFL assistant coach
 Robert H. Burris, recipient of the National Medal of Science
 Gibson Byrd, noted painter
 Angus Cameron, U.S. Senator
 Sean B. Carroll, professor of evolutionary biology
 Delia E. Wilder Carson (1833–1917), art educator
 Frederic G. Cassidy, editor-in-chief of the Dictionary of American Regional English
 Thomas Chrowder Chamberlin, founder of the Journal of Geology
 Bill Chandler, head coach of the Iowa State Cyclones and Marquette Golden Eagles men's basketball teams
 Y. Austin Chang, professor of material engineering
 Chang Jen-Hu, chairman of the board of directors of Chinese Culture University
 Arthur B. Chapman, professor of animal breeding and genetics
 Geep Chryst, NFL, assistant coach
 Paul Chryst, head football coach, University of Wisconsin-Madison
 Clarence S. Clay, Jr., geophysics faculty
 W. Wallace Cleland, biochemist
 John Coatta, NFL scout
 Eddie Cochems, head coach of the North Dakota State Bison, Clemson Tigers, Saint Louis Billikens, and Maine Black Bears football teams
 Bill Cofield, former men's basketball head coach, first African American coach of a major sport in the Big Ten Conference
 John R. Commons, one of the architects of Social Security in the United States
 Clifton F. Conrad, professor of educational leadership & policy analysis
 Ron Cooper, head coach of the Eastern Michigan Eagles, Louisville Cardinals, and Alabama A&M Bulldogs football teams
 Elizabeth A. Craig, biochemistry professor
 William Cronon, Frederick Jackson Turner and Vilas Research Professor of History, Geography, and Environmental Studies, winner of the Bancroft Prize, recipient of MacArthur fellowship
 James F. Crow, professor of genetics, population geneticist
 Vincent Cryns, professor of medicine, chief of endocrinology
 John Culbertson, professor of economics
 Richard N. Current, historian
 Merle Curti, historian of U.S. intellectual history
 Philip D. Curtin, historian
 John Thomas Curtis, botanist and ecologist, the Bray Curtis dissimilarity is partially named for him
 Marshall E. Cusic Jr., U.S. Navy admiral, Chief of the U.S. Navy Medical Reserve Corps
 Scott Cutlip, dean of the University of Georgia College of Journalism and Mass Communication
 Lawrence F. Dahl, professor emeritus of chemistry
 James Dahlberg, professor emeritus of biomolecular chemistry
 Farrington Daniels, early researcher in solar energy
 Richard Davis, jazz bassist
 Richard Davidson, professor of psychology and psychiatry, widely known for his mind-body research
 Carl de Boor, professor emeritus of mathematics and computer science; winner of National Medal of Science, best known for pioneering work on splines
 Hector DeLuca, researcher of vitamin D
 Robert Disque, president of the Drexel Institute of Technology
 Dave Doeren, head coach of the Northern Illinois Huskies football team
 Donald Downs, professor of political science
 Mitchell Duneier, sociologist
 Mike Eaves, NHL player and assistant coach
 Jordan Ellenberg, professor of mathematics, novelist, writer
 Edward C. Elliott, educational researcher and Purdue University president
 Amy Burns Ellis, professor of mathematics education
 Richard Theodore Ely (1854–1943), professor, social activist, economist
 Joseph Erlanger, 1944 Nobel Prize in Physiology or Medicine
 Nathan Feinsinger, chairman of the Wage Stabilization Board and associate general counsel to the National War Labor Board
 Carl Russell Fish, professor of history
 Harold K. Forsen, professor of Nuclear Engineering
 Perry A. Frey, professor of biochemistry
 Milton Friedman, associate professor of Economics Nobel Prize for Economics
 John Gallagher III, editor of the Astronomical Journal
 Adam Gamoran, professor of sociology and director, Wisconsin Center for Education Research
 Morton Ann Gernsbacher, professor of psychology and president of the Association for Psychological Science
 Harvey Goldberg, historian
 James R. Goodman, professor of computer science and computer architect, known for his work on cache coherence protocols
 Doug Graber, NFL assistant coach
 M. Elizabeth Graue, professor of Curriculum and Instruction
 Michelle Grabner, professor of art
 Luther W. Graef, president of the American Society of Civil Engineers
 Carson Gulley, head chef from 1927 to 1954

H–M

 Theodore S. Hamerow, historian
 Mike Hankwitz, head coach of the Arizona Wildcats and Colorado Buffaloes football teams
 Harry Harlow, psychologist, known for studies on affection using rhesus monkeys with artificial mothers
 Fred Harvey Harrington, historian
 Edwin B. Hart, conductor of the single-grain experiment, the Institute of Food Technologists' Babcock-Hart Award is partially named after him
 Einar Haugen, linguist
 Robert J. Havighurst, physicist, aging expert
 James Edwin Hawley, mineralogist, Hawleyite is named for him
 Carolyn Heinrich, former professor, currently Sid Richardson professor at University of Texas at Austin
 Daniel Hershkowitz (born 1953), Israeli politician, mathematician, rabbi, and president of Bar-Ilan University
 Elroy Hirsch, NFL player, member of the Pro Football Hall of Fame and College Football Hall of Fame
 Alexander Rudolf Hohlfeld, professor of German
 Jeff Horton, NFL assistant coach, head coach of the Nevada Wolf Pack and UNLV Rebels football teams
 Clark L. Hull, psychologist
 William Hunter, statistician
 Krisztina Morvai associate professor of law, member of the European Parliament
 Willard Hurst, seminal figure in the development of modern American legal history
 Anna Huttenlocher, cell biologist and rheumatologist
 Rob Ianello, head coach of the Akron Zips football team
 Hugh Iltis, known for his scientific discoveries in the domestication of corn
 Yannis Ioannidis, computer scientist
 Roland Duer Irving, member of the United States Geological Survey
 Greg Jackson, NFL player
 Arnold Jeter, head coach of the Delaware State Hornets football team
 Gunnar Johansen, artist-in-residence
 Bob Johnson, NHL head coach
 Mark Johnson, NHL player and 1980 Winter Olympics Miracle on Ice team
 Burr W. Jones, U.S. Representative
 Horace Kallen, philosopher
 Nietzchka Keene, filmmaker
 Jesse Lee Kercheval, poet, memoirist, translator and fiction writer
 Har Gobind Khorana, 1968 Nobel Prize in Physiology or Medicine, for describing the genetic code and how it operates in protein synthesis
 Franklin Hiram King, soil scientist and early promoter of sustainable agriculture
 Philip King, member of the College Football Hall of Fame
 Rufus King, U.S. diplomat, Union Army general
 Grayson L. Kirk, president of Columbia University
 Stephen Cole Kleene, a foundational contributor to theoretical computer science
 Rudolf Kolisch, violinist
 Thomas R. Kratochwill, psychologist
 Gloria Ladson-Billings, leading educational theorist and past president of the American Educational Research Association
 Elmer A. Lampe, head coach of the Georgia Bulldogs and Dartmouth Big Green men's basketball teams
 Jane Larson, feminist legal scholar
 Vernon Lattin (born 1938), president of Brooklyn College
 Judith Walzer Leavitt, professor of history of medicine, history of science, and women's studies
 Lewis Leavitt, pediatrician
 Mike Leckrone, director of the University of Wisconsin marching band from 1969 to 2019
 Joshua Lederberg, 1958 Nobel Prize in Physiology or Medicine
For his research in genetic structure and function in microorganisms
 Albert L. Lehninger, biochemist
 Charles Kenneth Leith, geologist, Penrose Medal recipient
 Aldo Leopold, author of A Sand County Almanac, which helped spawn the environmental movement and interest in ecology; also founded the Wilderness Society
 Gerda Lerner, professor emerita; historian of women's and gender history; considered a founder of women's history
 Philip H. Lewis Jr., landscape architect and planner
 Olin B. Lewis, Minnesota politician
 Tom Lieb, head coach of the Loyola Marymount Lions and Florida Gators football teams, Olympic medalist
 George Little, member of the College Football Hall of Fame
 Harvey Littleton, founder of the modern American studio glass movement
 Miron Livny, computer science professor and founder of the Condor High-Throughput Computing System
 William Lorenz, Army Distinguished Service Medal recipient
 Henry S. Magoon, U.S. Representative
 Abby Lillian Marlatt, director of home economics
 Carolyn "Biddy" Martin, professor of German and current president of Amherst College
 Abraham Maslow, psychologist, known for Maslow's hierarchy of needs
 Ron McBride, head coach of the Utah Utes and Weber State Wildcats football teams
 Dan McCarney, head coach of the Iowa State Cyclones and North Texas Mean Green football teams
 Anne McClintock, Simone de Beauvoir Professor and author of Imperial Leather: Race, Gender, and Sexuality in the Colonial Contest
 Elmer McCollum, biochemist, co-discovered vitamins A, B, and D
 Tasha McDowell, head coach of the Western Michigan Broncos women's basketball team
 Mike McGee, NFL player, head coach of the East Carolina Pirates and Duke Blue Devils football teams, member of the College Football Hall of Fame
 Nellie Y. McKay, scholar of African-American literature and co-editor of the Norton Anthology of African-American Literature
 Howard J. McMurray, U.S. Representative
 Patrick McNaughton, art historian, Associate Professor of Art History
 Milton McPike, NFL player
 Walter Meanwell, former head coach of the men's basketball team, member of the Naismith Memorial Basketball Hall of Fame
 Alexander Meiklejohn, philosopher and free-speech advocate
 William Shainline Middleton, co-founder and secretary-treasurer of the American Board of Internal Medicine
 Jacquelyn Mitchard, author of The Deep End of the Ocean
 Frederic E. Mohs, surgeon and developer of the Mohs surgery technique for removing types of skin cancer
 Howard Moore, head coach of the UIC Flames men's basketball team
 Perry Moss, NFL player, athletic director of Florida State University, head coach of the Florida State Seminoles and Marshall Thundering Herd football teams
 George L. Mosse, professor; historian of European nationalism and gender
 Reid F. Murray, U.S. Representative

N–S

 Gerhard Brandt Naeseth, genealogical author; member of the Royal Norwegian Order of St. Olav
 Adolphus Peter Nelson, U.S. Representative
 Kathryn Norlock, feminist philosopher
 Ronald Numbers, historian of science
 Allan R. Odden, professor in the Department of Educational Leadership & Policy Analysis
 Hakkı Ögelman, physicist and astrophysicist
 Richard Page, chair, department of medicine
 John Palermo, NFL assistant coach
 Charles D. Parker, Lieutenant Governor of Wisconsin
 Harry Partch, avant-garde composer
 Zorba Paster, co-host of Public Radio's Zorba Paster On Your Health
 Klaus Patau, geneticist, best known for the discovery of trisomy 13 (a.k.a. Patau syndrome)
 Stanley Payne, historian
 Russell W. Peterson, Governor of Delaware
 Saul Phillips, head coach of the North Dakota State Bison men's basketball team
 Felix Pollak, curator of Special Collections; poet
 Andrew C. Porter, former director of Wisconsin Center for Education Research, professor of education policy at Vanderbilt
 Ellis Rainsberger, head coach of the Kansas State Wildcats football team
 Hans Reese, Olympic athlete
 Paul Samuel Reinsch, U.S. diplomat
 Milton Resnick, artist-in-residence
 Pat Richter, NFL player, member of the College Football Hall of Fame
 Patrick T. Riley, political theorist
 Paul Roach, NFL assistant coach, athletic director and head football coach at the University of Wyoming
 Carl Rogers, psychologist and founder of Client-Centered Therapy
 Thomas A. Romberg, professor emeritus of curriculum and instruction (mathematics education)
 Walter Rudin, mathematician best known for his books on mathematical analysis
 Joe Rudolph, NFL player
 Bo Ryan, current head men's basketball coach
 Alfred A. Sanelli, U.S. Army general
 Harrison Schmitt, adjunct professor of engineering physics, 12th man on the Moon as Apollo 17 astronaut and geologist
 Hans Schneider, mathematician, best known for his contributions to the Linear Algebra and Matrix society
 Isaac Jacob Schoenberg, mathematician, best known for the discovery in 1946 of splines
 Jennifer Schomaker, chemist, professor, researcher
 John Settle, NFL player
 Donna Shalala, chancellor 1987–1993; secretary, U.S. Department of Health and Human Services, 1993–2001
 Charles S. Slichter, mathematician and physicist
 Ithamar Sloan, U.S. Representative
 Red Smith, MLB and NFL player and coach
 Oliver Smithies, faculty 1960 to 1988, recipient of the Nobel Prize in Physiology or Medicine in 2007
 Clarence Spears, member of the College Football Hall of Fame
 Bob Spoo, head coach of the Eastern Illinois Panthers football team
 Kurt Squire, director of the Games, Learning & Society Conference
 Dale Steele, head coach of the Campbell Fighting Camels football team
 Harry Steenbock, biochemist, vitamin D researcher
 John Stiegelmeier, head coach of the South Dakota State Jackrabbits football team
 Mike Stock, NFL assistant coach
 Scott Straus, assistant professor of Political Science and International Studies, specialising in the study of genocide
 Harry Stuhldreher, NFL player, member of the College Football Hall of Fame
 Stephen Suomi, director of the National Institute of Child Health and Human Development Comparative Ethology Laboratory at the National Institutes of Health
 Aage B. Sørensen, sociologist

T–Z

 Brandon Taylor, writer
 Cecil Taylor, jazz pianist
 Henry Charles Taylor, agricultural economist
 Howard Temin, 1975 Nobel Prize in Physiology or Medicine for the discovery of reverse transcriptase
 Edward Ten Eyck, first American to win the Diamond Challenge Sculls
 Eeva Therman, geneticist, characterized trisomy 13 and trisomy 18
 James Thomson, credited with first successful culturing of human embryonic stem cells
 Arthur Thrall, artist
 Giulio Tononi, professor of psychiatry
 Darold Treffert, psychiatrist
 Frederick Jackson Turner, historian and creator of the "frontier thesis" explaining the American character
 Timothy Tyson, professor of African-American history and author
 John J. Uicker, mechanical engineer
 Stanislaw Ulam, mathematician who joined the Manhattan Project during World War II
 Harry Vail, rowing coach, the Dad Vail Regatta is named after him
 Ryan G. Van Cleave, author
 Clark Van Galder, head coach of the Fresno State Bulldogs football team
 Charles R. Van Hise, geologist and university president who formulated the "Wisconsin Idea"
 Edward Burr Van Vleck, mathematician and professor
 Alexander Vasiliev (1867–1953), Byzantinist and Arabist
 Jan Vansina, historian of Africa and father of oral historical methodology
 Grace Wahba, statistician, developed generalized cross validation and formalized Wahba's problem
 Pete Waite, head coach of the women's volleyball team, author
 David Ward, president of the American Council on Education
 Oliver Patterson Watts, chemical engineer
 Viola S. Wendt, poet
 Albert Whitford, astronomer
 Eugene Wigner, 1963 Nobel Prize in Physics
 John Wilce, head coach of the Ohio State Buckeyes football team, member of the College Football Hall of Fame
 Noah Williams, economist
 William Appleman Williams, historian of American diplomacy
 Erik Olin Wright, sociologist
 Randall Wright, macroeconomist and pioneer of search theory in monetary economics
 Sewall Wright, professor of genetics, one of the fathers of population genetics
 Todd Yeagley, MLS player
 Kenneth Zeichner, winner of several awards for Teacher Education
 Efim Zelmanov, recipient of the Fields Medal in 1994
 Howard Zimmerman, organic chemist, discovered barrelene
 Otto Julius Zobel, inventor of the m-derived filter and the Zobel network

References

Lists of people by university or college in Wisconsin

people